Teemu Turunen (born 19 January 1986) is a Finnish footballer who plays as a midfielder. He currently represents Sogndal Fotball in Norwegian First Division, the second highest level of Norwegian football. He made his debut in Veikkausliiga in 2004 for FC KooTeePee. Turunen is a member of Finland national under-21 football team and he has visited the training camps of several foreign professional teams including Udinese, Rangers F.C., and SC Heerenveen. Teemu's younger brother Tuomo plays in Swedish Allsvenskan, for Trelleborgs FF.

References

1986 births
Living people
Finnish footballers
Finnish expatriate footballers
FC Inter Turku players
Veikkausliiga players
Expatriate footballers in Norway
Finnish expatriate sportspeople in Norway
Association football midfielders
People from Kuopio
Sportspeople from North Savo